Cowboy Holiday is a 1934 American Western film directed by Robert F. Hill, produced by Max Alexander and Arthur Alexander for Beacon Productions and starring Guinn "Big Boy" Williams and Richard Alexander.

Plot 
Buck Sawyer's friend, Sheriff Simpson, will lose his job if he doesn't catch the notorious bandit known as The Juarez Kid. Buck sets out to help Simpson catch the outlaw and keep his job.

Cast 
Guinn "Big Boy" Williams as Buck Sawyer
Janet Chandler as Ruth Hopkins
Julian Rivero as Pablo 'Juarez Kid' Escovar
Richard Alexander as Deputy Swanson, alias Walt Gregor
John Elliott as Sheriff Hank Simpson
Julia Bejarano as Mona Escovar
Alma Chester as Ma Simpson

Soundtrack 
Guinn "Big Boy" Williams - "Bury Me Not on the Lone Prairie"

External links 

1934 films
1930s English-language films
American black-and-white films
1934 Western (genre) films
American Western (genre) films
Films directed by Robert F. Hill
1930s American films